Stephan Louw (born 26 February 1975) is a Namibian long jumper.

At the 2001 Summer Universiade he won the silver medal in long jump and participated in the 4 × 100 metres relay. The Namibian relay team, which consisted of Louw, Sherwin Vries, Thobias Akwenye and Benedictus Botha, finished fourth in a new Namibian record of 39.48 seconds. The same year Louw competed at the World Championships, without reaching the final round. He also competed at the 2000 Summer Olympics, but all his jumps were invalid.

He finished twelfth at the 2006 African Championships, and won the bronze medal at the 2008 African Championships. He competed at the 2008 Olympic Games without reaching the final.

His personal best jump is 8.24 metres, achieved in January 2008 in Johannesburg. This is the current Namibian record.

Achievements

References

External links

1975 births
Living people
Namibian long jumpers
Athletes (track and field) at the 1998 Commonwealth Games
Commonwealth Games competitors for Namibia
Athletes (track and field) at the 2000 Summer Olympics
Athletes (track and field) at the 2008 Summer Olympics
Olympic athletes of Namibia
World Athletics Championships athletes for Namibia
Male long jumpers
Namibian male athletes
Universiade medalists in athletics (track and field)
Universiade medalists for Namibia
Medalists at the 2001 Summer Universiade
White Namibian people